The 2017–18 Colgate Raiders men's basketball team represented Colgate University during the 2017–18 NCAA Division I men's basketball season. The Raiders, led by seventh-year head coach Matt Langel, played their home games at Cotterell Court in Hamilton, New York as members of the Patriot League. They finished the season 19–14, 12–6 in Patriot League play to finish in second place. They defeated Lafayette and Holy Cross to advance to the championship game of the Patriot League tournament where they lost to Bucknell. They were invited to the College Basketball Invitational where they lost in the first round to San Francisco.

Previous season
The Raiders finished the 2016–17 season 10–22, 8–10 in Patriot League play to finish in a tie for sixth place. As the No. 6 seed in the Patriot League Tournament, they lost in the quarterfinals to Lehigh.

Roster

Schedule and results

|-
!colspan=9 style=| Exhibition

|-
!colspan=9 style=| Non-conference regular season

|-
!colspan=9 style=| Patriot League regular season

|-
!colspan=9 style=| Patriot League tournament

|-
!colspan=9 style=| CBI

References

Colgate Raiders men's basketball seasons
Colgate
Colgate
Colgate
Colgate